The PAC-nBook 1 is a netbook developed by the Pakistan Aeronautical Complex which was released in early 2012.

Development
The project was being developed since 2010 by the PAC in conjunction with INNAVTEK, a Hong Kong-based electronic parts manufacture.

Release
The n-Book was publicly launched in December 2011 and since then has entered production at a factory in Kamra, Pakistan

Sister products
Along with releasing the nBook the PAC also unveiled the
PAC-PAD 1 - an Android tablet
PAC-eBook 1 - an e-book reader

References

Information technology in Pakistan
Netbooks
Pakistan Aeronautical Complex products
Products introduced in 2012